Tat'yana Sergeyeva (born 1951) is a Russian composer.

Biography 
Tat'yana Pavlovna Sergeyeva was born in Tver, Russia. She studied music at the Moscow Conservatory and completed post-graduate work in composition, piano, and organ. Sergeyeva won the Shostakovich Composers' Prize in 1987 and became an Honored Artist of the Russian Federation in 1995. She is a member of the Russian Union of Composers.

Works 
Selected works include:
Aria for Mezzo-Soprano and Piano, on a text by A.Sumarokov (1984)
Aria for Mezzo-Soprano and Piano, on a text by I.Pisarev (1984)
Black Rose, for bayan, piano, violin, cello, and percussion (2001)
Concerto for violin, piano, harpsichord, and organ
Daphne, trio for saxophone, cello, and organ
Piano Concerto No.2
Piano Concerto No.3 (2002)
Serenade for Trombone and Organ (1995)
Sonata for Violin and Organ (1994)
Vocal Cycle for Mezzo-Soprano and Piano, on verses by ancient poets
Vocal Cycle on Verses by Tatiana Cherednichenko

Her works have been recorded and issued on CD, including:
Contemporary Russian Composers by Korupp (Audio CD - 1993)
Musical World of Tatiana Sergeyeva by Tatyana Sergeyeva, Dmitry Liss, and Vladimir Tinkha (Audio CD - 2000)

References 

1951 births
Living people
20th-century classical composers
Soviet composers
Russian women classical composers
Russian classical composers
People from Tver
Moscow Conservatory alumni
Honored Artists of the Russian Federation
20th-century women composers